The Belles Stakes is an American Thoroughbred horse race held annually for two-year-old fillies from 1886 through 1908 at Sheepshead Bay Race Track in Sheepshead Bay, New York. The race was run on dirt and for its final seven editions at a distance of five and one-half furlongs.

Historical notes
In 1889 the Belles Stakes was won by Reclare who was purchased by Henry Warnke for $475 at a July 1888 yearling sale. A working-class railroad employee, Warnke was a flagman with the Brighton Beach Railway and as a result of his filly's popularity fans and the media dubbed Reclare as "the flagman's filly." Going into her three-year-old campaign, a feature story in the April 1990 edition of The Illustrated American said that Reclare was "acknowledged the greatest of the two-year-old fillies of 1889."

La Tosca won the 1890 Belles Stakes and went on to be recognized as that year's American Champion Two-Year-Old Filly. She would repeat as the  American Champion Filly in 1891.

Two years later, Lady Violet would also earn 1892 American Champion Two-Year-Old Filly honors.

1905 winner Whimsical also won that year's Golden Rod Stakes at Sheepshead Bay and notably went on to win the 1906 Preakness Stakes Classic.

The Hart–Agnew law repercussions
On June 11, 1908, the Republican controlled New York Legislature under Governor Charles Evans Hughes passed the Hart–Agnew anti-betting legislation. The owners of Sheepshead Bay Race Track, and other racing facilities in New York State, struggled to stay in business without income from betting. Racetrack operators had no choice but to drastically reduce the purse money being paid out which resulted in the Belles Stakes offering a purse in 1908 that was forty percent less than what it had been in earlier years. These small purses made horse racing unprofitable and impossible for even the most successful horse owners to continue in business. As such, for the 1909 racing season management of the Sheepshead Bay facility dropped some of its minor stakes races and used the purse money to bolster its most important events. As a result, the Belles Stakes was not run in 1909.

The end of a racetrack
In spite of strong opposition by prominent owners such as August Belmont Jr. and Harry Payne Whitney, reform legislators were not happy when they learned that betting was still going on at racetracks between individuals and they had further restrictive legislation passed by the New York Legislature in 1910. The Agnew–Perkins Law, a series of four bills and recorded as the Executive Liability Act, made it possible for racetrack owners and members of its board of directors to be fined and imprisoned if anyone was found betting, even privately, anywhere on their premises.  After a 1911 amendment to the law that would limit the liability of owners and directors was defeated in the Legislature, every racetrack in New York State shut down.

Owners, whose horses of racing age had nowhere to go, began sending them, their trainers and their jockeys to race in England and France. Many horses ended their racing careers there and a number remained to become an important part of the European horse breeding industry. Thoroughbred Times reported that  more than 1,500 American horses were sent overseas between 1908 and 1913 and of them at least 24 were either past, present, or future Champions. When a February 21, 1913 ruling by the New York Supreme Court, Appellate Division saw horse racing return in 1913. However, it was too late for the Sheepshead Bay horse racing facility and it never reopened.

Records
Speed record:
 1:06.80 @ 5.5 furlongs – Petticoat (1908)
 1:09.80 @ 5.75 furlongs – Amicitia (1901)
 1:15.50  @ 6 furlongs – Bessie June (1886)

Most wins by a jockey:
 2 – Henry Griffin (1894, 1896)
 2 – Jack Martin (1902, 1905)
 2 – Willie Simms (1891, 1892)

Most wins by a trainer:
 3 – A. Jack Joyner (1892, 1904, 1908)

Most wins by an owner:
 2 – James R. & Foxhall P. Keene (1894, 1900)
 2 – Blemton Stable/August Belmont Jr. (1892, 1901)

Winners

References

Flat horse races for two-year-old fillies
Discontinued horse races in New York City
Sheepshead Bay Race Track
Recurring sporting events established in 1886
Recurring events disestablished in 1909
1886 establishments in New York (state)
1909 disestablishments in New York (state)